This article lists the tributaries of the River Thames from the sea to the source, in England. There are also secondary lists of backwaters of the river itself and the waterways branching off.

Note: the River Medway shares the saline lower Thames Estuary.

Tributaries

The average discharge is taken from the lowest point at which measurements are taken, which may be upstream of the confluence.

Backwaters and cuts
This list comprises the principal instances; longest ex-mill races (leats), with own articles are included; the main weirstream/river stream of each Thames lock is omitted and the smallest such associated instances but the Sheepwash Channel is included for its importance in Oxford.

Linked waterways

Poem by Alexander Pope listing some Thames tributaries

See also

Locks and weirs on the River Thames
Islands in the River Thames

References

 Cove-Smith, Chris (2006). The River Thames Book. Imray Laurie Norie and Wilson. .  
 Fred. S. Thacker The Thames Highway: Volume II Locks and Weirs, 1920. Republished by David & Charles, 1968.

External links
 Map of 'Tributaries of the River Thames' compiled from this list, includes tributaries and confluences

 
River Thames
Thames